Otter Lake is located northwest of Piseco, New York. Fish species present in the lake are brook trout, and white sucker. There is trail access off the east shore. No motors are allowed on this lake.

References

Lakes of New York (state)
Lakes of Hamilton County, New York